Peter Gideon (1820–1899) was a farmer near Excelsior, Minnesota, United States, who was responsible for breeding apples that could withstand Minnesota's climate. Gideon's farmhouse, now within the boundaries of Shorewood, Minnesota, is listed on the National Register of Historic Places.

Gideon moved to Minnesota in 1853, near Lake Minnetonka, and experimented with planting pear, plum, cherry, peach, and apple seeds. After ten years of experimentation, the harsh Minnesota winters had killed off all of his trees except for one seedling crab apple tree. Instead of giving up, he sent back to Bangor, Maine for seeds and scions, and continued his experiments by grafting a scion onto the crab apple tree. From this experiment, in 1868 he successfully selected a variety of apple that he named the "Wealthy", in honor of his wife.

In March 1878, Minnesota established a State Experimental Fruit Farm by act of the Legislature which Gideon ran for eleven years, planting many thousands of apple trees and distributing his best seeds across the state. The state farm was located near Gideon's land on Lake Minnetonka, under the jurisdiction of the University of Minnesota. When the farm closed in February 1889 due to conflicts with the University, Gideon lost his job. Gideon later became the first superintendent of a University of Minnesota agricultural experiment station established in 1878. The station was abandoned in 1889, when he retired, but in 1907 the Minnesota Legislature established a fruit breeding farm between Excelsior and Chaska. The fruit breeding farm later became the Horticultural Research Center, which is now part of the Minnesota Landscape Arboretum. The center later developed the Haralson apple, introduced in 1922.  The Wealthy apple is genetically related to the Haralson, though it took DNA testing to rediscover this fact after extensive hybridization.

See also
 John S. Harris (horticulturalist)

References

Houses in Hennepin County, Minnesota
Houses on the National Register of Historic Places in Minnesota
National Register of Historic Places in Hennepin County, Minnesota
Colonial Revival architecture in Minnesota